E. indica may refer to:
 Eleusine indica, the Indian goosegrass, wiregrass or crowfootgrass, an invasive grass species
 Ellurema indica, a fungus species
 Eugenia indica, a plant species endemic to India
 Eulabeia indica, the bar-headed goose, a bird species

Synonyms
 Erythrina indica, a synonym for Erythrina variegata, a tree species
 Eupodotis indica, a synonym for Sypheotides indica, a large bird species

See also
 Indica (disambiguation)